See also Athens, Illinois and Athens (disambiguation) for more places called "Athens".

New Athens is a village in St. Clair County, Illinois, United States. Based upon common usage, the 'A' is always sounded with a long vowel, rather than a short vowel, by its residents, unlike the most commonly used English pronunciation of the city in Greece.

The population was 2,054 at the 2010 census. New Athens sits on the Kaskaskia River and was originally called Athens. The village was laid out in 1836 and incorporated in 1866. The name change to New Athens came in 1868 after it was discovered there was already an Athens in another part of the state.

The area is known for the water sports recreation, including annual boat races and fishing derby. It is also the home of the Peabody River King Conservation Area.

Since New Athens is in the Metro East area of greater St. Louis, it also has a place in the local brewery history. New Athens was home to Mound City Brewery until the 1950s. Baseball is a major sport in the area and the village has produced a number of athletes who have played professionally. One of the favorite sons is Whitey Herzog, a former Major League Baseball outfielder and manager. Other former major leaguers with New Athens ties include Larry Stahl, Mickey Haefner, Warren Hacker and Rich Hacker.

New Athens is home to several churches, including St. Agatha Catholic Church, St. John United Church of Christ, St. Paul Lutheran Church, The United Methodist Church of New Athens, and First Baptist Church.

History
The first organized settlement in what would later become the future town of New Athens, Illinois was Manville Ferry named after early settler and ferryman on the Kaskaskia River, Ira Manville. Manville ran the ferry until his death in 1821. By 1818, the third generation of the Sturdivant family counterfeiters, known as the "Sturdivant Gang", were organized by Roswell S. Sturdivant and his brother, Merrick Sturdivant, who led the criminal organization, would base their southwestern Illinois counterfeiting operations at Manville Ferry and the other part of their criminal operation in southeastern Illinois on the Ohio River at Sturdivant's Fort, in Pope County, Illinois, now present-day Rosiclare, Hardin County, Illinois.

Geography
New Athens is located at  (38.322660, -89.874811).

Demographics

As of the census of 2000, there were 1,981 people, 774 households, and 541 families residing in the village. The racial makeup of the village was 97.98% White, 0.76% African American, 0.15% Native American, 0.35% Asian, 0.15% Pacific Islander, and 0.61% from two or more races. Hispanic or Latino of any race were 0.56% of the population.

There were 774 households, out of which 33.6% had children under the age of 18 living with them, 55.7% were married couples living together, 10.3% had a female householder with no husband present, and 30.1% were non-families. 26.0% of all households were made up of individuals, and 15.1% had someone living alone who was 65 years of age or older. The average household size was 2.49 and the average family size was 3.00.

In the village, the population was spread out, with 23.9% under the age of 18, 9.3% from 18 to 24, 28.9% from 25 to 44, 20.7% from 45 to 64, and 17.2% who were 65 years of age or older. The median age was 38 years. For every 100 females, there were 88.3 males. For every 100 females age 18 and over, there were 83.5 males.

The median income for a household in the village was $39,625, and the median income for a family was $49,236. Males had a median income of $36,307 versus $22,462 for females. The per capita income for the village was $17,627. About 6.8% of families and 8.4% of the population were below the poverty line, including 10.0% of those under age 18 and 6.7% of those age 65 or over.

Education 

The village of New Athens is the home of New Athens Community Unit School District #60 (NACUSD 60) – New Athens Township High School Yellow Jackets. The school website provides additional resources and references.

Notable people 

 Rich Hacker, coach for the St. Louis Cardinals and Toronto Blue Jays
 Whitey Herzog, outfielder and manager
 Sturdivant Gang, 19th Century counterfeiters

See also

 List of municipalities in Illinois

References

External links

 
 http://www.na60.org
 http://www.city-data.com/city/New-Athens-Illinois.html
 http://illinois.hometownlocator.com/il/st.-clair/new-athens.cfm

Villages in St. Clair County, Illinois
Villages in Illinois
Populated places established in 1836
1836 establishments in Illinois